Pusa is a town in Pusa District, Betong Division, Sarawak, Malaysia. It is situated nearby Saratok town. Mostly form for native Malay for fish village and famous of fish of "ikan terubok" (Toli shad) and also famous for "gula apong" (palm sugar).

Education

Primary school
 Sekolah Kebangsaan Serabang

Secondary school
 Sekolah Menengah Kebangsaan Pusa

Pusa District
Towns in Sarawak